The 1974 New York gubernatorial election was held on November 5, 1974 to elect the Governor and Lieutenant Governor of New York. Incumbent Republican governor Malcolm Wilson, who had ascended to the governorship following Nelson Rockefeller's resignation to begin work with the Commission on Critical Choices for Americans in 1973, was defeated by Democratic Hugh Carey. Carey became the first Democratic Governor of New York since W. Averell Harriman left office in 1958 after suffering defeat from Nelson Rockefeller in the election that same year.

Primaries

Democratic

Conservative

Results

See also
 1974 New York state election

References

1974
Gubernatorial
New York